Ursu is a Romanian-language surname that may refer to:

Adrian Ursu (b. 1969), Romanian journalist
Anne Ursu (b. ?), American novelist and children's writer
Doru Viorel Ursu (b. 1953), Romanian politician and lawyer
Gheorghe Ursu (1926 – 1985), Romanian construction engineer, poet, diarist and dissident
Ion Ursu (b. 1994), Moldovan footballer
Ionuț Ursu (b. 1989), Romanian footballer
Melania Ursu (1940 – 2016), Romanian stage and film actress
Neculai Alexandru Ursu (1926 – 2016), Romanian linguist, philologist and literary historian
Sergiu Ursu (b. 1980), Romanian discus thrower
Sonia Ursu-Kim (b. 1993), Romanian basketball player
Valentina Ursu (b. ?), Moldovan journalist
Vasile Ursu (b. 1948), Moldovan politician
Vasile Ursu Nicola (1731–1785), Transylvannian revolutionary

See also 
 Ursu River (disambiguation)
 Urs (disambiguation)
 Urși (disambiguation)
 Ursa (disambiguation)
 Ursoaia (disambiguation)
 Valea Ursului (disambiguation)

Romanian-language surnames